Thomas Beesley Jr. House is located in Middle Township, Cape May County, New Jersey, United States. The house was added to the National Register of Historic Places on February 12, 1998.

See also
National Register of Historic Places listings in Cape May County, New Jersey

References

Houses on the National Register of Historic Places in New Jersey
Houses in Cape May County, New Jersey
Italianate architecture in New Jersey
Middle Township, New Jersey
National Register of Historic Places in Cape May County, New Jersey
New Jersey Register of Historic Places